The 1966 Lunar Orbiter 1 robotic spacecraft mission, part of NASA's Lunar Orbiter program, was the first American spacecraft to orbit the Moon. It was designed primarily to photograph smooth areas of the lunar surface for selection and verification of safe landing sites for the Surveyor and Apollo missions. It was also equipped to collect selenodetic, radiation intensity, and micrometeoroid impact data.

Mission summary
Mission controllers injected the spacecraft into a parking orbit around Earth on August 10, 1966, at 19:31 UTC. The trans-lunar injection burn occurred at 20:04 UTC. The spacecraft experienced a temporary failure of the Canopus star tracker (probably due to stray sunlight) and overheating during its cruise to the Moon. The star tracker problem was resolved by navigating using the Moon as a reference, and the overheating was abated by orienting the spacecraft 36 degrees off-Sun to lower the temperature.

Lunar Orbiter 1 was injected into an elliptical near-equatorial lunar orbit 92.1 hours after launch. The spacecraft acquired photographic data from August 18 to 29, 1966, and readout occurred through September 14, 1966.

A total of 42 high-resolution and 187 medium-resolution frames were taken and transmitted to Earth covering more than 5 million square kilometers of the Moon's surface, accomplishing about 75% of the intended mission, although a number of the early high-resolution photos showed severe smearing. It also took the first two pictures of Earth from the Moon. Accurate data were acquired from all other experiments throughout the mission.

While not disclosed until after the end of the Cold War, the imaging system on the Lunar Orbiter spacecraft were the same Eastman Kodak cameras developed by the National Reconnaissance Office (NRO) for the SAMOS reconnaissance satellites. NASA extended the camera innovation further by developing the film onboard the spacecraft and then scanning the photos for transmission via a video signal.

Orbit tracking showed a slight "pear-shape" of the Moon based on the gravity field, and no micrometeorite impacts were detected. The spacecraft was tracked until it impacted the lunar surface on command at 7 degrees north latitude, 161 degrees east longitude (selenographic coordinates) on the Moon's far side on October 29, 1966, on its 577th orbit. The early end of the nominal one-year mission resulted from a shortage of remaining attitude control gas and other deteriorating conditions and was planned to avoid transmission interference with Lunar Orbiter 2.

See also

 Lunar Orbiter Image Recovery Project
 Exploration of the Moon
 Lunar Orbiter 2
 Lunar Orbiter 3
 Lunar Orbiter 4
 Lunar Orbiter 5
 List of artificial objects on the Moon

References

1
Spacecraft launched in 1966
Spacecraft that orbited the Moon
Spacecraft that impacted the Moon
1966 on the Moon